Clarence Arthur "Ted, Teddy" Saunders (August 29, 1911 – May 21, 2002) was a Canadian professional ice hockey player who played 19 games in the National Hockey League with the Ottawa Senators in their final season of 1933–34. The rest of his career, which lasted from 1930 to 1944, was spent in various minor leagues. He played for the Ottawa Commandos which won the 1943 Allan Cup. Before his death, he was the last surviving member of the original Ottawa Senators.

Career statistics

Regular season and playoffs

Transactions
 October 4, 1933 — traded to Ottawa by Boston with Perk Galbraith and Bob Cook for Bob Gracie.
 December 8, 1933 — traded by Ottawa Senators to Detroit Olympics for cash.

References

External links
 

1911 births
2002 deaths
Boston Cubs players
Canadian ice hockey right wingers
Canadian military personnel of World War II
Detroit Olympics (IHL) players
Ice hockey people from Ottawa
Military personnel from Ottawa
Ottawa Senators (1917) players
Ottawa Senators (QSHL) players
Philadelphia Ramblers players
St. Paul Saints (AHA) players
Springfield Indians players